is a former Japanese football player and manager. He is currently the Manager of Ehime FC.

Playing career
Saneyoshi was born in Minamiuwa District, Ehime on October 19, 1972. After graduating from Ritsumeikan University, he joined Gamba Osaka in 1995. He became a regular player from first season and played many matches for the club for a long time. In 1990s, he played many matches as mainly left side back. However he got hurt in 2000 and he could hardly play in the match. From 2002, he played many matches as mainly center back and the club won the 3rd place in 2002 and 2004 J1 League. In 2005, the club were crowned the champions of J1 League for the first time in the club history. He could hardly play in the match from 2006 and retired end of 2007 season.

Coaching career
After retirement, Saneyoshi started coaching career at Gamba Osaka in 2008. He served as coach for youth team (2008) and top team (2009–13). In 2014, he moved to Nagoya Grampus and served as coach. In 2016, he returned to Gamba Osaka. He became a manager for new team Gamba Osaka U-23. and managed the team in 1 season. In July 2018, U-23 team manager Tsuneyasu Miyamoto became a top team manager. So, Saneyoshi became a U-23 team manager again as Miyamoto successor. Saneyoshi resigned with Gamba end of 2018 season. On February 1, 2020, Saneyoshi was appointed manager of Kyoto Sanga FC, where he finished in 8th place. On the February 1st, 2021, Saneyoshi was appointed as assistant manager of Ehime FC. After the resignation of Shigenari Izumi on April 4, 2021, Saneyoshi was promoted to the position of manager on 7 April 2021.

Club statistics

Managerial statistics
 Manager statistics

References

External links
 
 

1972 births
Living people
Ritsumeikan University alumni
Association football people from Ehime Prefecture
Japanese footballers
J1 League players
Gamba Osaka players
Japanese football managers
J2 League managers
J3 League managers
Gamba Osaka U-23 managers
Kyoto Sanga FC managers
Ehime FC managers
Association football defenders